Symphyotrichum is a genus of flowering plants in the tribe Astereae which includes the commonly cultivated New York aster (S. novi-belgii) and New England aster (S. novae-angliae). Its species are widespread in the Americas, including as far north as subarctic North America to as far south as Chile, Argentina, and the Falkland Islands. One species has a native range extending into eastern Eurasia.

Most of the species in the genus are perennials. The flower heads have white, pink, purple, or blue ray florets surrounding white to yellow disk florets. The disk floret corollas become pink, purple, or brown after pollination. The three species in section Conyzopsis have reduced or absent ray florets.

Symphyotrichum is the type genus of subtribe Symphyotrichinae. There are 98 species in the genus, some with varieties, and thirteen named hybrids. The genus is split into five subgenera: Chapmaniana, Astropolium, Virgulus, Ascendentes, and Symphyotrichum. Most of the species had been classified within the genus Aster until it was confirmed to be polyphyletic. The American asters now are separated into monophyletic genera based on multiple phylogenetic studies.

Conventions

Conservation status codes follow the NatureServe conservation (NS) rounded global status scheme. Hybrids have a column for parents in place of conservation status. Not listed (NL) is not a NatureServe category but is used here to represent those left out of global status rankings up to G5 (including GNA and GNR) and those not in NatureServe. Type species for each clade are in a separate table.

Classification

Classification of Symphyotrichum

Subtribe Symphyotrichinae contains six genera. In addition to Symphyotrichum, these are Almutaster, Ampelaster, Canadanthus, Psilactis, and Sanrobertia, with Symphyotrichum being the largest at 98 species and thirteen named hybrids. The cladogram presented here for the subtribe is based on a combination of cytotaxonomic and morphologic data reported in multiple studies. Symphyotrichum is the type genus of the subtribe.

Classification within Symphyotrichum
Most of the species had been classified within the genus Aster until it was confirmed to be polyphyletic. The American asters were then separated based on morphological characteristics and phylogenetic studies. S. novae-angliae and S. turbinellum are monotypic within sections. S. novae-angliae is classified in the subgenus Virgulus. In 1994, it was placed in section Grandiflori, subsection Polyligulae. In 2002, it was segregated within its own section Polyliguli. The list follows the 2002 circumscription of section Polyliguli for the species. S. turbinellum is classified in the subgenus Symphyotrichum. It has been placed within its own section Turbinelli. It was previously placed in section Symphyotrichum, subsection Turbinelli. The list follows the more recent circumscription of section Turbinelli for the species.

Symphyotrichum subg. Chapmaniana 
Symphyotrichum subg. Astropolium 
Symphyotrichum subg. Virgulus 
sect. Ericoidei 
sect. Patentes 
subsect. Brachyphylli 
subsect. Patentes
sect. Grandiflori 
subsect. Mexicanae 
subsect. Grandiflori 
sect. Polyliguli 
sect. Concolores 
Symphyotrichum subg. Ascendentes 
Symphyotrichum subg. Symphyotrichum
sect. Conyzopsis 
sect. Occidentales 
sect. Turbinelli 
sect. Symphyotrichum
subsect. Dumosi 
subsect. Heterophylli 
series Concinni 
series Cordifolii 
subsect. Porteriani 
subsect. Symphyotrichum
series Punicei 
series Symphyotrichum

Species list

Subgenus Chapmaniana

Subgenus Astropolium

Subgenus Virgulus
Subgenus Virgulus

Section Ericoidei

Section Patentes
Section Patentes

Subsection Brachyphylli

Subsection Patentes

Section Grandiflori
Section Grandiflori

Subsection Mexicanae

Subsection Grandiflori

Section Polyliguli

Section Concolores

Subgenus Virgulus named hybrids

Subgenus Ascendentes
This subgenus contains two allopolyploid species derived from the historic hybridization of plants from the subgenera Symphyotrichum and Virgulus.

Subgenus Symphyotrichum

Section Conyzopsis
The three species in section Conyzopsis have reduced or absent ray florets.

Section Occidentales

Section Turbinelli

Section Symphyotrichum

Subsection Dumosi

Subsection Heterophylli
Subsection Heterophylli

Series Concinni

Series Cordifolii

Subsection Porteriani

Subsection Symphyotrichum

Series Punicei

Series Symphyotrichum

Subgenus Symphyotrichum named hybrids

Notes

Citations

References

Symphyotrichum